Patrick Russell (1629 – 14 July 1692) was an Irish Roman Catholic prelate. He was Archbishop of Dublin from August 1683 until his death, having been imprisoned owing to his support for Jacobitism.

Biography
Russell was a native of Rush, County Dublin, the son of James Russell. He was educated at the Irish College at Lisbon where he was ordained in 1654. Returning to Ireland he served in the parish of Church of St Nicholas of Myra Without, Dublin, and was made vicar general of the diocese in 1675. Following Archbishop Peter Talbot arrest in 1678 and death in 1680 during the Popish Plot, Russell assumed responsibility for the Archdiocese of Dublin. His own elevation to the archbishopric by Pope Innocent XI was dated 2 August 1683.

The suspension of the Penal Laws following the accession of James II of England enabled Russell to reorganise the church within the archdiocese. He convened two provincial assemblies in 1685 and 1688 and three diocesan synods in 1686, 1688, and 1689. In July 1685 he signed the petition presented by the catholic hierarchy of Ireland to James II asking him to empower the Earl of Tyrconnell to protect them in the exercise of their ministry. James II gave Russell a pension of £200 per year. Upon the king's arrival in Dublin in March 1689 following the Glorious Revolution, Russell led several services in James' presence.

After the Jacobite defeat at the Battle of the Boyne, Russell fled Ireland to join the exiled Jacobite court at Château de Saint-Germain-en-Laye. He returned to Ireland in secret in 1692, but was captured and imprisoned in Dublin Castle, where he died in July of that year during his trial.

A Compendium of Irish Biography (1878) says of him:

References

External links
 http://www.libraryireland.com/biography/ArchbishopPatrickRussell.php

1629 births
1692 deaths
Irish Jacobites
People from County Dublin
17th-century Roman Catholic archbishops in Ireland
Roman Catholic archbishops of Dublin